Melaleuca linguiformis is a plant in the myrtle family, Myrtaceae and is endemic to the south of Western Australia. It is a shrub with hairy new growth, small leaves and heads of white flowers similar to Melaleuca teuthidoides shorter sepals and more stamens in each flower.

Description

The flowers are white to cream-coloured and arranged in heads or short spikes on the ends of branches which continue to grow after flowering. The stamens are arranged in five bundles around the flower and there are13 to 22 stamens in each bundle.

Taxonomy and naming
Melaleuca linguiformis was first formally described in 1999 by Lyndley Craven in Australian Systematic Botany from a specimen collected in the Salmon Gums Nature Reserve. The specific epithet (linguiformis) is "from the Latin lingua, tongue, and forma shape, in reference to the tongue-like shape of the leaves".

Distribution and habitat
Melaleuca linguiformis occurs in the Salmon Gums and Wittenoom Hills districts in the Mallee biogeographic region. It usually grows in dense shrub or heath over sand or loam, often in saline soils.

Conservation
Melaleuca linguiformis is listed as "not threatened" by the Government of Western Australia Department of Parks and Wildlife.

References

linguiformis
Plants described in 1999
Endemic flora of Western Australia
Taxa named by Lyndley Craven